Air Commodore Douglas Bradshaw, DFC, CD, ADC (15 May 1912 – 1 October 1996) was a Canadian Air Commodore and educator. He was the Commandant of the Royal Military College of Canada from 1954 to 1957. He was the first president of Confederation College of Applied Arts and Technology from March 6, 1967, to 1974.

Education
Douglas Alexander Ransome Bradshaw was born on May 15, 1912, in Ottawa, Ontario (ON). He was educated in London, Ontario. He graduated from the Royal Military College of Canada in Kingston, Ontario, in 1934, student # 2140.

Military career
He was commissioned in the Royal Canadian Dragoons. He transferred to the RCAF in 1935. He received his pilot's license in 1936. He served as a flying instructor at Camp Borden, Ontario from 1935 to 1939. In December 1941, he was posted overseas. From March 1942 until April 1943, Wing Commander Bradshaw commanded 420 Snowy Owl Squadron. During this time, Bradshaw led his squadron in some of the first 1000 plane bomber raids into Germany.

At the end of World War II, Group Captain Bradshaw served at RCAF headquarters in Ottawa as Director of Air Operations. He was promoted to the rank of Air Commodore in January 1953. He served as Chief of Training for the RCAF.
He returned to RMC in Kingston as Commandant and ADC to the Governor-General (1947–54). He served as Deputy Air Officer Commanding (Operations) at Air Defense Command Headquarters, St. Hubert, Quebec in 1957.
In November 1959, he was appointed Deputy for Operations for Northern NORAD Region Headquarters, in St. Hubert, Quebec. He was appointed Chief Staff Officer at the RCAF's No. 1 Air in July 1961.

Awards
He was awarded the DFC effective June 3, 1943, for his skill and bravery as a pilot. He led 420 Snowy Owl Squadronon many risky and dangerous sorties to heavily defended enemy targets in Germany.

Civilian career
Air Vice Marshal (ret`d) Douglas Bradshaw was the first president of Confederation College from March 6, 1967, to 1974. Confederation College was founded as a trade school in 1967, during the formation of Ontario's college system. His vision of an aviation program in the north was implemented in the college's Aviation Centre of Excellence.

Legacy
He died on 1 October 1996. In his memory, the Douglas Bradshaw Athletic Achievement Award is presented to a graduating student, having the most improvement in and contribution to athletics and whose quality of spirit and competitive drive contributed to the overall success of the Confederation College Athletic program.

See also

References

4237 Dr. Adrian Preston & Peter Dennis (Edited) "Swords and Covenants" Rowman And Littlefield, London. Croom Helm. 1976.
H16511 Dr. Richard Arthur Preston "To Serve Canada: A History of the Royal Military College of Canada" 1997 Toronto, University of Toronto Press, 1969.
H16511 Dr. Richard Arthur Preston "Canada's RMC - A History of Royal Military College" Second Edition 1982
H1877 R. Guy C. Smith (editor) "As You Were! Ex-Cadets Remember". In 2 Volumes. Volume I: 1876–1918. Volume II: 1919–1984. Royal Military College. [Kingston]. The R.M.C. Club of Canada. 1984

1912 births
1996 deaths
Canadian generals
Recipients of the Distinguished Flying Cross (United Kingdom)
Royal Military College of Canada alumni
Commandants of the Royal Military College of Canada
Royal Canadian Air Force personnel of World War II
Military personnel from Ottawa
Canadian World War II pilots
Royal Canadian Dragoons officers